The Red Menace (reissue title Underground Spy) is a 1949 anti-communist film noir drama film directed by R. G. Springsteen starring Robert Rockwell and Hannelore Axman.

Plot
An ex-GI named Bill Jones (Robert Rockwell) becomes involved with the Communist Party USA. While in training, Jones falls in love with one of his instructors. At first true followers of communism, they realize their mistake when they witness party leaders murder a member who questions the party's principles. When they try to leave the party, the two are marked for murder and hunted by the party's assassins.

Cast
 Robert Rockwell as Bill Jones
 Hannelore Axman as Nina Petrovka (credited as Hanne Axman)
 Betty Lou Gerson as Yvonne Kraus
 Barbra Fuller as Mollie O'Flaherty 
 Shepard Menken as Henry Solomon
 Lester Luther as Earl Partridge
 William Lally as Jack Tyler (credited as William J. Lally)
 Lloyd G. Davies as Inspector O'Toole
 Norman Budd as Reachi
 Leo Cleary as Father O'Leary
 Kay Riehl as Mrs. O'Flaherty
 William Martell as Immigration Insp. Riggs 
 James Harrington as Martin Vejac
 Duke Williams as Sam Wright
 Napoleon Simpson as Tom Wright
 Robert H. Purcell as Sheriff of Talbot (credited as Roberto Purcell)
 Royal Raymond as Benson 
 Gregg Martell as Schuitz 
 Jimmy Hawkins as Jimmy (credited as Jimmie Hawkins)

See also
 List of American films of 1949

References

External links

1949 films
1949 drama films
American anti-communist propaganda films
American drama films
Cold War films
Films directed by R. G. Springsteen
Films scored by Nathan Scott
Republic Pictures films
Films shot in Los Angeles
American black-and-white films
1940s English-language films
1940s American films